Ramjipura Khurd is a small village 50 km away from Jaipur, Rajasthan, India.  There are more than 200 houses.  Many Rajputs live in Ramjipura Khurd, as well as other castes.

Villages in Jaipur district